Pir Hasan Mausoleum is a historical and religious architectural monument of the XVII century located in Mardakan.

History 
An inscription with a stone frame is placed on the entrance door of the mausoleum. According to the inscription, the tomb was built in 1021 in the Hijri calendar (1612/1613 AD) during the reign of Shah Abbas I.

The second inscription, located on the left side of the main construction inscription, shows that the building was built by master Nadir Ali.

Architecture 
The main tomb building has a square shape in the plan. The entrance, which is 2.2 meters ahead of the main tomb building, is covered with an arrow-shaped arched roof. Inside the mausoleum, double protrusions at the four corners were fixed to the sail. The dome covering the tomb building is supported by these sails. The building is covered with well-cut sandstone both inside and out.

References

Literature

Source 
 
 

Tourist attractions in Baku
Safavid architecture
Islamic architecture
Mausoleums in Azerbaijan